The String Quartet in E-flat major is an early work composed by Felix Mendelssohn in 1823 but not published until 1879. The quartet was not assigned an opus number and is not numbered.

Movements 

Like all of Mendelssohn's string quartets, this work has four movements:

 Allegro moderato
 Adagio non troppo
 Menuetto and Trio
 Fuga

A typical performance lasts just under 24 minutes.

External links 
 
  (Review of several recordings of the complete Mendelssohn string quartets including a movement by movement analysis of the 1823 quartet.)

String quartets by Felix Mendelssohn
1823 compositions
Compositions in E-flat major
Compositions by Felix Mendelssohn published posthumously